Bolshoye Khavino is a rural locality (a village) in Gorodetskoye Rural Settlement, Kichmengsko-Gorodetsky District, Vologda Oblast, Russia. The population was 37 as of 2002.

Geography 
Bolshoye Khavino is located 22 km southwest of Kichmengsky Gorodok (the district's administrative centre) by road. Shatenevo is the nearest rural locality.

References 

Rural localities in Kichmengsko-Gorodetsky District